Ngcobo is a surname. It may refer to:

Abednigo Ngcobo (1950–2014), South African association football player
Chris Ngcobo, former Acting head of Intelligence for the South African Police Service
David Junior Ngcobo, South African hip hop musician, songwriter and record producer known as Nasty C
Gabi Ngcobo, South African curator
Lauretta Ngcobo (1931–2015), South African novelist and essayist
Patrick Ngcobo (died 2015), South African Carnatic classic musician
Njabulo Ngcobo, South African footballer
Sandile Ngcobo (born 1953), former Chief Justice of South Africa
Sandile Ngcobo (rugby union) (born 1989), South African rugby union player
Shiyani Ngcobo, South African Maskandi guitarist and teacher 
Sthembiso Ngcobo (born 1983), South African association football player

Bantu-language surnames